The Ultimate Fighting Championship (UFC) is a mixed martial arts (MMA) promotion, founded in 1993 by Art Davie and Rorion Gracie. The organization was purchased from its parent company SEG in 2001 by Zuffa LLC, a promotional company owned by Las Vegas casino magnates, Lorenzo and Frank Fertitta and managed by Dana White (current president of operations). Since its inception, and through its current Zuffa management, the UFC has remained one of the more dominant MMA promotions in the world, playing host to a wide field of MMA fighters.

This list provides an up-to-date roster of all mixed martial artists with  Czech citizenship that represent Czech Republic competing or have previously competed under the UFC promotional banner. Fighters are organized by weight class and within their weight class by their number of appearances inside the UFC. Fighter record and notable wins, achievements. Tournament participation and overall UFC/MMA records In 2022, Jiří Procházka became the Czech Republic's first UFC Champion after defeating Glover Teixeira for the Light Heavyweight title at UFC 275.

Each fight record has four categories: wins, losses, draws, and no-contests (NC). All fight records in this article are displayed in that order, with fights resulting in a no-contest listed in parentheses.

List

Notes

References

Czech
Lists of mixed martial artists
UFC